Cloud feedback is the coupling between cloudiness and surface air temperature where a surface air temperature change leads to a change in clouds, which could then amplify or diminish the initial temperature perturbation. Cloud feedbacks can affect the magnitude of internally generated climate variability or they can affect the magnitude of climate change resulting from external radiative forcings.

Global warming is expected to change the distribution and type of clouds.  Seen from below, clouds emit infrared radiation back to the surface, and so exert a warming effect; seen from above, clouds reflect sunlight and emit infrared radiation to space, and so exert a cooling effect. Cloud representations vary among global climate models, and small changes in cloud cover have a large impact on the climate. Differences in planetary boundary layer cloud modeling schemes can lead to large differences in derived values of climate sensitivity. A model that decreases boundary layer clouds in response to global warming has a climate sensitivity twice that of a model that does not include this feedback. However, satellite data show that cloud optical thickness actually increases with increasing temperature. Whether the net effect is warming or cooling depends on details such as the type and altitude of the cloud; details that are difficult to represent in climate models.

Other effects of cloud feedback
In addition to how clouds themselves will respond to increased temperatures, other feedbacks affect clouds properties and formation. The amount and vertical distribution of water vapor is closely linked to the formation of clouds. Ice crystals have been shown to largely influence the amount of water vapor. Water vapor in the subtropical upper troposphere has been linked to the convection of water vapor and ice. Changes in subtropical humidity could provide a negative feedback that decreases the amount of water vapor which in turn would act to mediate global climate transitions.

Changes in cloud cover are closely coupled with other feedback, including the water vapor feedback and ice–albedo feedback. Changing climate is expected to alter the relationship between cloud ice and supercooled cloud water, which in turn would influence the microphysics of the cloud which would result in changes in the radiative properties of the cloud. Climate models suggest that a warming will increase fractional cloudiness. The albedo of increased cloudiness cools the climate, resulting in a negative feedback; while the reflection of infrared radiation by clouds warms the climate, resulting in a positive feedback. Increasing temperatures in the polar regions is expected in increase the amount of low-level clouds, whose stratification prevents the convection of moisture to upper levels. This feedback would partially cancel the increased surface warming due to the cloudiness. This negative feedback has less effect than the positive feedback. The upper atmosphere more than cancels negative feedback that causes cooling, and therefore the increase of CO2 is actually exacerbating the positive feedback as more CO2 enters the system.

A 2019 simulation predicts that if greenhouse gases reach three times the current level of atmospheric carbon dioxide that stratocumulus clouds could abruptly disperse, contributing to additional global warming.

Cloud feedback in IPCC report

The Intergovernmental Panel on Climate Change (IPCC) assessment reports contain a summary of the current status of knowledge on the effect of cloud feedback on climate models. The  IPCC Fourth Assessment Report (2007) stated:
By reflecting solar radiation back to space (the albedo effect of clouds) and by trapping infrared radiation emitted by the surface and the lower troposphere (the greenhouse effect of clouds), clouds exert two competing effects on the Earth’s radiation budget. These two effects are usually referred to as the SW (shortwave) and LW (longwave) components of the cloud radiative forcing (CRF). The balance between these two components depends on many factors, including macrophysical and microphysical cloud properties. In the current climate, clouds exert a cooling effect on climate (the global mean CRF is negative). In response to global warming, the cooling effect of clouds on climate might be enhanced or weakened, thereby producing a radiative feedback to climate warming (Randall et al., 2006; NRC, 2003; Zhang, 2004; Stephens, 2005; Bony et al., 2006).

In the most recent, the IPCC Fifth Assessment Report (2013), cloud feedback effects are discussed in the Working Group 1 report, in Chapter 7, "Clouds and Aerosols", with some additional discussion on uncertainties in Chapter 9, "Evaluation of Climate Models". The report states "Cloud feedback studies point to five aspects of the cloud response to climate change which are distinguished here: changes in high-level cloud altitude, effects of hydrological cycle and storm track changes on cloud systems, changes in low-level cloud amount, microphysically induced opacity (optical depth) changes and changes in high-latitude clouds."  The net radiative feedback is the sum of the warming and cooling feedbacks; the executive summary states "The sign of the net radiative feedback due to all cloud types is less certain but likely positive. Uncertainty in the sign and magnitude of the cloud feedback is due primarily to continuing uncertainty in the impact of warming on low clouds." They estimate the cloud feedback from all cloud types to be +0.6 W/m2°C (with an uncertainty band of −0.2 to +2.0), and continue, "All global models continue to produce a near-zero to moderately strong positive net cloud feedback."

The closely related effective climate sensitivity has increased substantially in the latest generation of global climate models. Differences in the physical representation of clouds in models drive this enhanced sensitivity relative to the previous generation of models.

See also
Fixed anvil temperature hypothesis

References

Climate forcing